Evgeny Yakovlevich Remez (sometimes spelled as Evgenii Yakovlevich Remez, ; (born 1895 in Mstislavl, now Belarus; died 1975 in Kyiv, now Ukraine) was a Soviet mathematician. He is known for his work in the constructive function theory, in particular, for the Remez algorithm and the Remez inequality.

His doctoral students include Boris Korenblum.

References

V K Dzyadyk, Yu A Mitropol'skii and A M Samoilenko, Evgenii Yakovlevich Remez (on the centenary of his birth) (Ukrainian), Ukrain. Mat. Zh. 48 (2) (1996), 285-286.
Yu A Mitropol'skii, V K Dzyadyk and V T Gavrilyuk, Evgenii Yakovlevich Remez (on the occasion of the ninetieth anniversary of his birth) (Russian), Ukrain. Mat. Zh. 38 (4) (1986), 539-540.
Yu A Mitropol'skii, V K Dzjadyk and V T Gavriljuk, Evgenii Yakovlevich Remez (on the occasion of his eightieth birthday) (Russian), Ukrain. Mat. Z. 28 (5) (1976), 711.

External links

Remez at MacTutor

Soviet mathematicians
Approximation theorists
1890s births
1975 deaths
Belarusian Jews